Thunderbolt, in comics. may refer to:

Thunderbolt (Marvel Comics), a Daredevil supporting character
Thunderbolts (comics), a Marvel Comics team of reformed supervillains
Thunderbolt Ross, an Incredible Hulk supporting character
Thunderbolt (DC Comics), a genie associated with the DC Comics characters Johnny Thunder and Jakeem Thunder
Peter Cannon, Thunderbolt, a Charlton Comics character
Thunderbolt Jaxon, a Golden Age British superhero currently being revived in a Wildstorm comic series by Dave Gibbons and John Higgins

See also
Thunderbolt (disambiguation)